Opataouaga Lake is a freshwater body of the Broadback River hydrographic slope of the municipality of Eeyou Istchee James Bay (municipality), in the administrative region of Nord-du-Québec, in Quebec, in Canada.

Forestry is the main economic activity of the sector. Recreational tourism activities come second with a large navigable body of water upstream of Lake Poncheville, and downstream Quénonisca Lake and the Broadback River.

The hydrographic slope of lake Opataouaga is accessible through the forest road R1023 (East-West direction) coming from the West and passing north of “Île au Pain de Sucre” (English: Sugarloaf Island); the R1023 connects the "James Bay Road" (North-South direction) that comes from Matagami; from “Île au Pain de Sucre”, this road heads north-east to the west side of Lac Rocher.

The surface of Opataouaga Lake is usually frozen from early November to mid-May, however, safe ice circulation is generally from mid-November to mid-April.

Geography

Toponymy
Of Cree origin, this hydronym means "the lake with the sandy tip". This toponymic designation is indicated in the "Fifth Report of the Geographic Board of Canada 1904", published in Ottawa in 1905, page 46, under the graph: "Opatawaga; Lake, Northeast of Mattagami Lake, Abitibi District, Que. (Not Opiwatakan)".

The toponym Lake Opataouaga was formalized on December 5, 1968 at the Commission de toponymie du Québec, at the creation of this commission.

Notes and references

See also 

Eeyou Istchee James Bay
Broadback River drainage basin
Opataouaga
Jamésie